Sarah-Maude Lachance (born 7 December 1998) is a Canadian rugby union player. She plays at Fly-half for Canada and for Section Paloise.

Lachance was named in the Canadian squad for the inaugural 2021 Pacific Four Series against the United States. She competed for Canada at the delayed 2021 Rugby World Cup in New Zealand.

References

External links 

 Sarah-Maude Lachance at Canada Rugby

Living people
1998 births
Female rugby union players
Canadian female rugby union players
Canada women's international rugby union players